The Rani Kamalapati-New Delhi Shatabdi Express is a train operated by the Northern Railway which runs between New Delhi, the main railway station of India's capital territory, New Delhi, and Rani Kamlapati Railway Station the sub-urban railway station of Bhopal City, the state capital of central Indian state of Madhya Pradesh. It is one of the fastest train in India with a maximum permissible speed of 150 km/h.

It runs on the New Delhi-Agra stretch. The train commenced service in 1988 and was the first Shatabdi train to be introduced. The train was extended to Rani Kamlapati Railway Station in the railway budget of 2014-15 .

History
The name "Shatabdi" means century in Sanskrit. The first Shatabdi Express train was introduced in 1988 to commemorate the birth century of Jawahar Lal Nehru, the first Prime Minister of India. Madhavrao Scindia was the Indian Railway Minister at that point of time and the Shatabdi Express was his brainchild. The first Shatabdi Express was flagged off between New Delhi and Jhansi which was later extended to 
Bhopal and Rani Kamalapati.

Coach composition
The train has 14 AC Chair Car, 2 Executive Class & EOG coaches.

The train is expected to switch to HOG, where power for Hotel Load of the train is drawn from locomotive after commissioning of HOG fit WAP 5 locomotive.

Train

The train is fully air-conditioned and is based on  LHB coach. Cost of meals is covered in the ticket fare, and the travellers are provided with snacks, meals, coffee/tea, a one-litre water bottle/ 300ml packaged water (provided by the railways owned and operated subsidiary '"Rail Neer"), and juice.

Schedule 
The schedule of this 12001/12002 New Delhi - Rani Kamalapati (Habibganj) Shatabdi Express is given below:-

Route 
The train covers following major cities: New Delhi, Mathura Junction, Agra Cantonment, Morena railway station Gwalior, Jhansi, Bhopal & Rani Kamalapati

See also

References

External links
 http://indianexpress.com/article/india/politics/rail-budget-list-of-new-extended-trains/
http://indiarailinfo.com/train/1516?

Railway services introduced in 1988
Rail transport in Madhya Pradesh
Shatabdi Express trains
1988 establishments in India
Transport in Bhopal
Transport in Delhi
Rail transport in Delhi